Percnarcha is a genus of moths in the family Gelechiidae.

Species
 Percnarcha strategica Meyrick, 1930
 Percnarcha latipes (Walker, [1865])
 Percnarcha lilloi (Köhler, 1941)
 Percnarcha trabeata (Meyrick, 1909)

References

Gelechiinae